Khomarak (also Romanized as Khomārak; also known as Khovārak, Khuārak, and Khumarak) is a village in Sojas Rud Rural District, Sojas Rud District, Khodabandeh County, Zanjan Province, Iran. At the 2006 census, its population was 340, in 76 families.

References 

Populated places in Khodabandeh County